Marvin Bristol Rosenberry (February 12, 1868February 15, 1958) was an American lawyer and judge from the U.S. state of Wisconsin. He was the 13th Chief Justice of the Wisconsin Supreme Court, and was the longest-serving chief justice in the court's history, having served nearly 21 years in the role.

Biography
Born in River Styx, Ohio, Rosenberry and his family moved to Fulton, Michigan, where they had a farm. Rosenberry went to what is now Eastern Michigan University and then taught school for a few years. He then received his law degree from the University of Michigan Law School and opened a law office in Wausau, Wisconsin.

In 1916, he was appointed to the Wisconsin Supreme Court and, in 1929, Rosenberry became chief justice of the Supreme Court serving until his retirement in 1950. For almost 21 of his nearly 34 years on the bench, Rosenberry served as chief justice. By the time of his retirement, his opinions were published in 91 volumes of the Wisconsin Reports and he had participated in more than 11,000 cases, approximately 50 percent of all cases heard before the Wisconsin Supreme Court since its inception.

Rosenberry Redistricting Commission

In 1950, the state had not passed a full redistricting plan in 30 years.  Responding to the courts and public opinion, the Legislature appointed a special redistricting committee and asked Judge Rosenberry to chair.  Rosenberry took up the duty, the commission produced a viable plan within four months, and the Legislature passed the plan in the 1951 session (1951 Wisc. Act 728).  After two more years of political wrangling, the plan was utilized in 1954 and remained the state district plan through 1963.  During the wrangling over the plan, the Wisconsin Supreme Court ruled that the Legislature could only enact one redistricting plan per census.

References

External links
 
 Justice Marvin B. Rosenberry at Wisconsin Court System

People from Medina County, Ohio
People from Kalamazoo County, Michigan
Politicians from Wausau, Wisconsin
Eastern Michigan University alumni
University of Michigan Law School alumni
Chief Justices of the Wisconsin Supreme Court
1868 births
1958 deaths